The Gau March of Brandenburg (German: Mark Brandenburg) was formed in March 1933 initially under the name Gau Electoral March (German: Kurmark) in Nazi Germany as a district within the Free State of Prussia. In January 1939, Kurmark was renamed March of Brandenburg. The Gau was dissolved in 1945, following Allied Soviet occupation of the area and Germany's formal surrender. After the war, the territory of the former Gau became part of the state of Brandenburg in East Germany except for areas beyond the Oder-Neisse line, which were given to the Polish People's Republic. Most of its territory is now divided between Germany's State of Brandenburg and Poland's Lubusz Voivodeship.

History
The Nazi Gau (plural Gaue) system was originally established in a party conference on 22 May 1926, in order to improve administration of the party structure. From 1933 onward, after the Nazi seizure of power, the Gaue increasingly replaced the German states as administrative subdivisions in Germany.

At the head of each Gau stood a Gauleiter, a position which became increasingly more powerful, especially after the outbreak of the Second World War, with little interference from above. Local Gauleiters often held government positions as well as party ones and were in charge of, among other things, propaganda and surveillance and, from September 1944 onward, the Volkssturm and the defense of the Gau.

The position of Gauleiter in March of Brandenburg was originally held by Wilhelm Kube (1933–36), followed by Emil Sturtz (1936–45).

The Ravensbrück concentration camp and Sachsenhausen concentration camp were located in Gau March of Brandenburg. Ravensbrück was a women's camp. Of the 132,000  prisoners that were sent to the camp 92,000 perished. Of the estimated 200,000 prisoners at Sachsenhausen 30,000 perished. However this figure does not include prisoners that died on the way to the camp or were never registered and killed on arrival, the latter mostly Soviet prisoners of war.

References

External links
 Illustrated list of Gauleiter

March of Brandenburg
1933 establishments in Germany
1945 disestablishments in Germany
Brandenburg